Sok is a river in Samara and Orenburg Oblasts, Russia, a left tributary of the Volga. It flows southwest to meet the Samara Bend of the Volga near Sokolyi Mountains, north of the city of Samara. The major tributary is Kondurcha.

Europe's oldest pottery was found on the banks of the Sok River (see Elshanka culture for details).

References 

Rivers of Samara Oblast
Rivers of Orenburg Oblast